Royal Academy may refer to:

Language and literature
 Real Academia Española ("Royal Spanish Academy" or "RAE"), the institution responsible for regulating the Spanish language
 Royal Academy of Dramatic Art, a British drama school
 Royal Academy of Dutch language and literature

Civilian education
 Royal Academy of Turku, founded 1640, now the University of Helsinki
 Royal Irish Academy, one of Ireland's premier learned societies and cultural institutions
 Royal West of England Academy or RWA, an institution (founded 1844) based in Bristol, England, UK
 Mount Royal Academy (New Hampshire), a Roman Catholic high school
 Royal Academy of Cambodia, a Cambodian educational institution
 Irvine Royal Academy, Scottish educational institution
 Inverness Royal Academy, a Scottish educational institution
 Belfast Royal Academy, an educational institution

Art and architecture
 Royal Danish Academy of Fine Arts, an art institution and group of art schools in Copenhagen, Denmark
 Royal Academy of Arts, also simply known as the Royal Academy (RA), an art institution (founded 1768) based in London, England, UK
 Royal Academy of Fine Arts Antwerp (Koninklijke Academie voor Schone Kunsten Antwerpen), an art and design academy based in Antwerp, Belgium
 Royal Academy of Fine Arts (Ghent), (founded 1741), in Ghent
 Royal Academy of Art (The Hague), (founded 1682), an art academy based in The Hague
 Académie de peinture et de sculpture, (founded 1648), in Paris
 Académie Royale des Beaux-Arts, (founded 1711), in Brussels
 Real Academia de Bellas Artes de San Fernando ("Royal Academy of Fine Art of San Fernando"), Spain's most prestigious fine arts institution
 Swedish Royal Academies, a group of independent organisations that promote arts and culture in Sweden
 Royal Scottish Academy, an art institution in Scotland
 Academy of Fine Arts Munich, founded as the "Royal Academy of Fine Arts"
 Royal Hibernian Academy, an Irish arts academy
 Royal Swedish Academy of Arts
 Royal Academy summer exhibition, a London art exhibit
 Royal Canadian Academy of Arts
 Korean Royal Academy of Painting (founded between 1463 and 1469)

Music and dance
 Royal Academy of Dance, a dance institution specialising in Classical Ballet, founded in London, England in 1920.
 Royal Academy of Music, a music conservatoire based in London
 Royal Danish Academy of Music
 Royal Academy of Music in Aarhus
 Royal Academy of Music Museum, a British music museum
 Royal Swedish Academy of Music
 Royal Academy (China), a historical institution for music, dance and theatre in China

Sciences

Belgium 
 Royal Flemish Academy of Belgium for Science and the Arts
 The Royal Academies for Science and the Arts of Belgium
 Royal Academy of Overseas Sciences, a Belgian scientific academy
 Royal Belgian Entomological Society

United Kingdom 
 Royal Society, the Academy of Sciences of the United Kingdom
 Royal Academy of Engineering, a national engineering institution based in London
 Royal Astronomical Society
 Royal Aeronautical Society
 Royal Society of Medicine
 Royal Society of Tropical Medicine and Hygiene

France 
 The Royal Academy of Sciences, one of the names of the French Academy of Sciences (founded 1666), which is now part of the French Institute

Spain 
 Spanish Royal Academy of Sciences
 Spanish Royal Academy of Naval Engineers
 Real Academia de la Historia
 Real Academia de Ciencias Morales y Políticas
 Royal Academy of Jurisprudence and Legislation
 Royal Academy of Pharmacy
 Royal Academy of Engineering of Spain
 Spanish Royal Society of Chemistry

Italy
 Royal Academy of Italy
 Royal Academy of Sciences and Humanities of Naples
 Royal Medico-Surgical Academy of Napoli
 Reale Accademia Ercolanese

Other 
 Royal Swedish Academy of Sciences
 Royal Danish Academy of Sciences and Letters
 Royal Irish Academy
 Royal Netherlands Academy of Arts and Sciences
 Royal Scientific Society
 Royal Society of New Zealand

Military
 Royal Military Academy, Woolwich, a British academy for engineers and artillery, now closed
 Royal Military Academy
 Royal Military Academy Sandhurst, British
 Royal Naval Academy, British
 Chulachomklao Royal Military Academy, Thai military academy

Other
 Royal Academy (horse), a thoroughbred racehorse

See also
 Regal Academy, an Italian animated television series
 Royal Society (disambiguation)